View of Olinda is a painting by Frans Post, a Dutch painter who was the first European-trained painter to depict landscapes of the Americas. The painting depicts Olinda Cathedral in ruins, damage that was sustained when the Dutch seized a portion of Brazil from the Portuguese. The painting is notable for its depiction of Brazilian animals, based on drawings Post made from life in Brazil. The painting has its original frame, which is also decorated with motifs from nature.

Further reading 

 Benjamin Schmidt, "The 'Dutch' 'Atlantic' and the Dubious Case of Frans Post," Dutch Atlantic Connections, 1680-1800: Linking Empires, Bridging Borders (Leiden: Brill, 2014).

References 

Dutch paintings
17th-century paintings